Forgotten Realms, subtitled "War of the Avatars", was a computer-moderated play-by-mail game (PBM) published by Reality Simulations that was set in the Savage Frontier of the Forgotten Realms.

Development
The game was designed by Paul Brown.

Gameplay
50 players per game adventured in a world comprising 5,000 hexagons of varied terrain, where they controlled various characters, military forces, and communities. Diplomacy and combat were important parts of gameplay. The company published a "top-10 chart" every turn to highlight significant realm accomplishments.

Each game lasted until one of the players met the victory conditions, usually 35–50 turns, at a cost of $1.50 per turn plus 50 cents for each move (to a maximum, of $15 per turn.) After twenty turns, players could summon a god's avatar to aid them.

Reception
Kuo W. Ping reviewed the game in the July–August 1996 issue of Paper Mayhem magazine and stated it was "one of the best PBM games I have yet played". Ping described the game as "very fun and enjoyable" and rated it with "high marks" while suggesting two areas to improve.

Awards
Forgotten Realms won the Origins Award for Best New Play-by-Mail Game of 1994.

References

Origins Award winners
Play-by-mail games